Over the years the British comic magazine The Dandy has had many different strips ranging from humour strips to adventure strips to prose stories. However eventually the Dandy changed from having all these different types of strips to having only humour strips. Prose stories were the first to go being phased out in the 1950s. Adventure strips were phased out in the 1980s.

The Dandy

The Digital Dandy

Following the end of the print Dandy, The Dandy moved to the internet and became a digital comic and relaunched from Issue 1. The Digital Dandy then relaunched again in April 2013 starting once again from Issue 1.

Cover stars
1937–1984 Korky the Cat
1984–1999 Desperate Dan
1999–2000 Cuddles and Dimples
2000–2004 Desperate Dan
2004–2007 Jak
2007–2010 None
2010–2011 Harry Hill's Real Life Adventures in TV Land
2012–2012 Bananaman
Artists for the stars:
1937–1984 James Chrichton/Charles Grigg
1984–2004 Ken Harrison
2004–2007 Wayne Thompson
2007–2010 None
2010–2011 Nigel Parkinson
2012–2012 Wayne Thompson

See also
The Dandy
The Beano
List of Beano comic strips
List of Beano comic strips by annual
The Beezer
List of Beezer comic strips
List of Beezer and Topper comic strips

References

Dandy

Dandy